Austroperlidae is a family of stoneflies in the order Plecoptera. There are about 10 genera and 15 described species in Austroperlidae.

Genera
These 10 genera belong to the family Austroperlidae:
 Acruroperla Illies, 1969
 Andesobius McLellan, 2001
 Austroheptura Illies, 1969
 Austropentura Illies, 1969
 Austroperla Needham, 1905
 Crypturoperla Illies, 1969
 Klapopteryx Navás, 1928
 Penturoperla Illies, 1960
 Pseudoheptura Riek, 1973
 Tasmanoperla Tillyard, 1921

References

Further reading

 
 
 
 
 

Plecoptera
Plecoptera families
Aquatic insects